The year 1827 in architecture involved some significant architectural events and new buildings.

Events
 Work begins on the Athenaeum Club, London, designed by Decimus Burton.

Buildings and structures

Buildings completed

 Staatliche Münze Karlsruhe (Baden), designed by Friedrich Weinbrenner (died 1826).
 Sing-Akademie zu Berlin, designed by Carl Theodor Ottmer.
 Old Council House, Bristol (England), designed by Robert Smirke.
 Union Club and Royal College of Physicians, Trafalgar Square, London, designed by Robert Smirke.
 Fireproof Building, Charleston, South Carolina, designed by Robert Mills.
 Mills Building, South Carolina Lunatic Asylum, designed by Robert Mills.
 Naval Medical Center Portsmouth (Virginia), designed by John Haviland.
 Hospital Real de Inválidos Militares de Runa (Portugal).
 Partis College, Bath (England) (almshouses).
 Bank of Louisiana, New Orleans.
 London Colosseum (panorama), designed by Decimus Burton for Thomas Hornor.
 Tremont Theatre, Boston (Massachusetts), designed by Isaiah Rogers.
 Hamburg Stadt-Theater.
 Lapua Cathedral (Finland), designed by Carl Ludvig Engel.
 Holy Trinity Church, Helsinki (Finland), designed by Carl Ludvig Engel, dedicated.
 Christ Church Cathedral (Hartford, Connecticut), designed by Ithiel Town.
 Church of St Mary, Haggerston (London), designed by John Nash, consecrated.
 Yeshua Tova Synagogue, Bucharest (Romania).
 Passage Choiseul (arcade), Paris, designed by Francois Mazois and completed by Antoine Tavernier.
 Halkyn Castle (Wales) (residence), designed by John Buckler.
 Hart-Cluett Mansion, Troy, New York, probably by Martin Euclid Thomson.
 Beckford's Tower, near Bath (England) (folly), designed by Henry Goodridge for William Beckford.
 Godmanchester Chinese Bridge (England), designed by James Gallier.
 Ozimek Suspension Bridge (Poland), designed by Karl Schottelius.
 New stone Shillingford Bridge (across River Thames in England).
 Beam Aqueduct, Rolle Canal, north Devon (England), designed by James Green.

Awards
 Grand Prix de Rome, architecture: Théodore Labrouste.

Births
 January 17 – Samuel Hartt Pook, American naval architect based in Boston (died 1901)
 February 9 – Luigi Fontana, Italian sculptor, painter and architect (died 1908)
 March 14 – George Frederick Bodley, English architect (died 1907)
 May 16 – Pierre Cuypers, Dutch architect associated with Amsterdam (died 1921)
 June 18 – William Hill, English architect associated with Leeds (died 1889)
 August 3 – John Williams Tobey, American architect, carpenter and builder (died 1909)
 September 19 – J. P. Seddon, English architect and designer (died 1906)
 October 15 – Friedrich Adler, German architect and archaeologist (died 1908)

Deaths
 March 11 – John Pinch the elder, English architect associated with Bath, Somerset (born 1769)
 April 27 – John Foster, Sr., English architect, Senior Surveyor to the Corporation of Liverpool and dock engineer (born 1758)
 November 1 – Louis-François Cassas, French landscape painter, sculptor, architect, archaeologist and antiquary (born 1756; stroke)

References

Architecture
Years in architecture
19th-century architecture